A bees knees (or bee's knees) is a Prohibition era cocktail made with gin, fresh lemon juice,  and honey. It is served shaken and chilled, often with a lemon twist. 

The name comes from prohibition-era slang meaning "the best".

History
The bee's knees cocktail has unclear origins. It was possibly invented by Frank Meier, an Austrian-born, part Jewish bartender who was the first head bartender at the Ritz in Paris in 1921, when its Cafe Parisian opened its doors.

A 1929 news article attributes the cocktail to Margaret Brown, an American socialite.

In 2017, Barr Hill Gin started an annual event called Bee's Knees Week to encourage people to enjoy the bee's knees cocktail. Bee's Knees Week is the largest sustainability event in the spirits industry, focused on pollinator protection. A 2023 article published by The New York Times credited an increase in the cocktail's popularity in part to Bee's Knees Week.

Variations

 Barr Hill Gin is sometimes recommended for its honey infusion, though other gins may be used (including Barr Hill's Tom Cat gin).
 The honey may be diluted 1:1 with warm water to thin the consistency. 
 The honey may be diluted 1:1 with simple syrup instead of water.
 A sprig of basil or thyme may be used for garnish instead of lemon peel.
 Some variations contain orange juice.
 Add two dashes of absinthe and two dashes of orange bitters to make a variation called the "oldest living Confederate widow".

References

Cocktails with gin
Citrus cocktails
Three-ingredient cocktails